The second round of the 1999–2000 UEFA Cup began on 19 October 1999. The round included 48 winners from the first round.

Matches

|}

First leg

Second leg

2–2 on aggregate; AEK Athens won on away goals.

Bologna won 4–2 on aggregate.

Wolfsburg won 1–0 on aggregate.

Udinese won 2–1 on aggregate.

Monaco won 3–1 on aggregate.

Deportivo La Coruña won 5–1 on aggregate.

Roma won 3–0 on aggregate.

2–2 on aggregate; Werder Bremen won on away goals.

Slavia Prague won 3–2 on aggregate.

Parma won 4–1 on aggregate.

Leeds United won 7–1 on aggregate.

Atlético Madrid won 5–1 on aggregate.

Nantes won 7–0 on aggregate.

2–2 on aggregate; Panathinaikos won away goals.

Lens won 5–2 on aggregate.

Ajax won 3–1 on aggregate.

3–3 on aggregate; Benfica won 4–1 on penalties.

Kaiserslautern won 2–1 on aggregate.

Lyon won 2–0 on aggregate.

Juventus won 4–2 on aggregate.

Newcastle United won 5–2 on aggregate.

Steaua București won 2–0 on aggregate.

Celta Vigo won 4–2 on aggregate.

Mallorca won 5–1 on aggregate.

External links
Second Round Information
RSSSF Page
Worldfootball.net Page

1999–2000 UEFA Cup